ATRACO FC was a football club from Kigali in Rwanda. It won the Rwandan Premier League in 2008. It was the club of the Association of Transport Companies, which had been dissolved in 2011. The 2009/10 season was the last played by the team, which finished in second place.

Honours

Domestic competitions
Rwandan Premier League: 1
 2008

Rwandan Cup: 1
 2009

International
Kagame Interclub Cup: 1
 2009

Performance in CAF competitions
CAF Champions League: 1 appearance
2009 – Preliminary Round

CAF Confederation Cup: 2 appearances
2007 – First Round of 16
2010 – Preliminary Round

References

Sport in Kigali
Football clubs in Rwanda